The Greens of Europe (LVdeE) is a green political party in Spain founded in 2005 as a split from the Confederation of the Greens.

The party has been the ruling party of the Spanish municipality of Villena since 2011, winning an absolute majority in the 2015 Spanish local elections.

References

2005 establishments in Spain
Defunct political parties in Spain
Green political parties in Spain
Political parties established in 2005
Political parties with year of disestablishment missing